Walter Zapp (– 17 July 2003) was a Baltic German inventor. His greatest creation was the Minox subminiature camera.

Biography 

Zapp was born in Riga, Governorate of Livonia (now Latvia). In 1932, while living in Estonia, he began developing the then  subminiature camera by first creating wooden models, which led to the first prototype in 1936. It was introduced to the market in 1938. Minox cameras were made by VEF (Valsts Elektrotehniskā Fabrika) in Latvia. VEF made 17,000 Minox cameras.

During the Spring 1941 Resettlement of Baltic Germans, Walter Zapp moved to Germany. From 1941 to 1945, he worked on the development of electron microscopy at AEG in Berlin.

After World War II, in 1945, he founded the Minox GmbH in Wetzlar, Germany. The company still exists.

In 2001, when he went to Latvia for the last time, he said that he had gone to celebrate his 100th birthday in Latvia. He died aged 97, in Binningen near Basel, Switzerland.

Patents 
The innovative design and technical solutions of Zapp's camera were patented around the world. VEF received 66 patents in 18 countries for Zapp's inventions. Later in the 60's,  Zapp was named as the inventor in several patents granted to Minox GmbH for improvements and modifications of a subminiature camera. In the beginning of 90's, Zapp patented his last invention,   the Minox T8 pocket telescope.

Publications

Awards and honors 
In 2001, Walter Zapp received an honorary doctorate of the Latvian Academy of Sciences and was decorated with the Order of the Cross of Terra Mariana for his special services to the Republic of Estonia. Eesti Post has issued a Europa postage stamp in 1994 to commemorate Walter Zapp and his patented invention (Estonian patent No. 2628), the Minox subminiature camera.

See also
 Minox
 VEF

References

Further reading 
Morris G. Moses, John Wade. Spycamera: The Minox Story. 2nd, illustrated edition. HOVE FOTO BOOKS SATTER Incorporated, 1998. , 
D. Scott Young. Minox: Marvel in Miniature. 1st Books, 2000. 
Hubert E. Heckmann. MINOX The Queen of Spy Cameras, Variations in 8x11. Wittig Books, 2012.

External links 
 Minox Historical Society
 Obituary at the Independent

1905 births
2003 deaths
Engineers from Riga
People from the Governorate of Livonia
Baltic-German people
Estonian inventors
20th-century Latvian inventors
20th-century German inventors
Recipients of the Order of the Cross of Terra Mariana, 4th Class
Estonian emigrants to Germany